The 1995 Intercontinental Final was the seventeenth running of the Intercontinental Final. Previously the IC Final had been the final qualifying stage for Motorcycle speedway riders from Scandinavia, the USA and from the Commonwealth nations for the old single meeting World Final. From 1995 riders from the Intercontinental Final moved into the GP Challenge as part of qualifying for the new Speedway Grand Prix series established in 1995. However, riders would be racing for a place in the following years SGP series and not for the current year.

This was the re-introduction of the Intercontinental Final which had last been run in 1990. From 1991 to 1994 the IC Final was replaced by the World Semi-finals.

Intercontinental Final
 20 August
  Elgane, Elgane Speedway
 Top 3 plus 1 reserve to GP Challenge
 Peter Karlsson seeded to GP Challenge
 Jason Crump seeded to 1996 Speedway Grand Prix

References

See also
 Motorcycle Speedway

1995
World Individual